is a professional Japanese footballer. His birthday has also been reported as June 27, 1978.

Career 
After completing the 2002 season at Shizuoka Sangyo University, he moved to Brazil where he played for Londrina EC during the 2003 season.

At the start of 2004 he joined Górnik Zabrze in Poland's top division  and was reported to be the first Japanese player to play in Poland. During the 2005/06 season he played for FC Municipal Târgovişte in Romania. He is also reported to have tried his luck in Italy.

On April 12, 2005 it was reported that Nougawa had apparently signed with Canon Yaoundé in Cameroon on a one-year contract and that he would be the first Japanese player to play in Africa. Nogawa, it was reported, moved to the Cameroon because of the "country's football reputation" and because he admired Patrick Mboma, who played in Japan. Komodo Sport, a sports management company based in Indonesia and owned by Maboang Kessack, who played for Cameroon at the 1990 World Cup, was reported as being behind this deal.

However, as it turned out, no contract had been signed and after five days in Yaoundé the player left, despite earlier promising to win the national championship with the club.

International career 
He represented Japan at the U-17 level.

References

Japanese expatriate footballers
Japanese footballers
1984 births
Living people
Górnik Zabrze players
Canon Yaoundé players
Expatriate footballers in Brazil
Expatriate footballers in Cameroon
Expatriate footballers in Poland
Expatriate footballers in Romania
Japanese expatriate sportspeople in Poland
Japanese expatriate sportspeople in Romania
Association football forwards